West Kill Mountain, or Westkill Mountain, is located in Greene County, New York. 
The mountain is named after the West Kill stream which flows along its northern side, and is part of the Devil's Path range of the Catskill Mountains.
To the east, West Kill Mountain faces Southwest Hunter Mountain across  Diamond Notch; to the west, West Kill faces North Dome across Mink Hollow.

West Kill Mountain stands within the watershed of the Hudson River, which drains into New York Bay. 
The north slopes drain into the West Kill, thence into Schoharie Creek, the Mohawk River, and the Hudson River. 
The southeast slopes of the mountain drain into Hollow Tree Brook, thence into Stony Clove Creek, Esopus Creek, and the Hudson River. 
The southwest slopes of West Kill Mountain drain into the Broadstreet Hollow stream, thence into Esopus Creek.

West Kill Mountain is contained within the Westkill Mountain Wilderness Area of New York's Catskill State Park.

See also 
 List of mountains in New York

References

External links 

 
 
 

Mountains of Greene County, New York
Catskill High Peaks
Mountains of New York (state)